John George Trump (August 21, 1907 – February 21, 1985) was an American electrical engineer, inventor, and physicist.  A professor at the Massachusetts Institute of Technology from 1936 to 1973, he was a recipient of the National Medal of Science and a member of the National Academy of Engineering. Trump was noted for developing rotational radiation therapy. Together with Robert J. Van de Graaff, he developed one of the first million-volt X-ray generators.

Early life and education
John was the youngest of three children, and the second son of German immigrants Frederick Trump and Elizabeth Christ Trump. He was born in New York City on August 21, 1907.

John's brother, Fred, joined their mother in real estate development and management while still in his teens (Elizabeth Trump & Son). Initially, John and his brother tried working together building houses, but ultimately they dissolved their partnership, and John pursued a career in electrical engineering.

Trump received his bachelor's degree in electrical engineering from the New York University Tandon School of Engineering (then Polytechnic Institute of Brooklyn) in 1929, his master's degree in physics from Columbia University, and his doctorate of electrical engineering from the Massachusetts Institute of Technology (MIT) in 1933. He was a professor at MIT from 1936 until 1973.

War service
During World War II, Trump switched from work on hospital X-ray machines to research into similar technologies, especially the development of radar.  During 1940, he joined the newly formed National Defense Research Committee (NDRC), as technical aide to Karl Compton, President of MIT, who was serving also as the Chairman of the Radar Division within the NDRC.

During 1942, Trump became Secretary of the Microwave Committee, a sub-committee of the NDRC. The director of the Microwave Committee was Alfred Lee Loomis, the "millionaire physicist", who decided to create a laboratory. He selected a site for it, chose a suitably discreet and ambiguous name for it, and funded its construction, until governmental administration was established. The new institution came to be called the MIT Radiation Laboratory, or the "Rad Lab". As wartime shortages in Britain increased, many of its radar researchers would move to the well-funded laboratory at MIT, where they helped create groundbreaking progress in developing practical devices and systems, which would see widespread field deployment in combat.

The British had already started researching radar, which they termed Radio Direction Finder (RDF). Their Tizard Mission to the US showed how much more advanced they were with some of the key technologies, particularly the magnetron. The US decided to send a team to Britain to help coordinate their efforts with the "British Branch of the Radiation Laboratory" (BBRL), which operated as a department of Britain's Telecommunications Research Establishment (TRE) at Malvern, in Worcestershire. From February 1944 to the end of the war in Europe, Trump was the Director of the BBRL. 

In early 1943, two days after the death of Nikola Tesla, the Federal Bureau of Investigation ordered the Office of Alien Property Custodian to seize Tesla's belongings. Trump was called in to analyze the Tesla artifacts, which were being held in government custody. After a three-day investigation, Trump's report concluded that there was nothing which would constitute a hazard in unfriendly hands.

During the war, Trump also served in the Advisory Specialist Group on Radar, advising USAAF General Carl Spaatz on navigational radar, precision-bombing radar, and also defenses against the German radars found in their night-fighters and in their flak units. The systems included: Gee, Oboe, LORAN, H2X, MEW & SCR-584. Trump worked with all the most important British radar experts, including Sir Robert Watson-Watt, A.P. Rowe, and Bernard Lovell. At the end of the war, Trump also conducted debriefing interviews with Germany's main radar technicians. Trump received recognition for his war-work partnership from both the United States and the United Kingdom.

Post-war career
In 1946, Trump, Robert J. Van de Graaff, and Denis M. Robinson initiated the High Voltage Engineering Corporation (HVEC) to produce Van de Graaff generators.

He returned to MIT to teach and direct research for three decades after the war. He directed the MIT High Voltage Research Laboratory from 1946 to 1980. Some of his research at MIT concentrated on treating wastewater. He researched using an electron beam from a high voltage accelerator as the deactivating agent in the treatment of municipal wastewater sludge. The High Voltage Research Laboratory developed a prototype system that was tested at one of Boston's wastewater treatment plants, and it was able to provide bacterial and viral disinfection via continuous on-line treatment. 

Trump died in Boston on February 21, 1985.

The National Academy of Engineering described John Trump as "a pioneer in the scientific, engineering and medical applications of high voltage machinery". James Melcher, Trump's lab director, is quoted as saying: "John, over a period of three decades, would be approached by people of all sorts because he could make megavolt beams of ions and electrons – death rays... What did he do with it? Cancer research, sterilizing sludge out in Deer Island [a waste disposal facility], all sorts of wondrous things. He didn't touch the weapons stuff."

Personal life
John G. Trump was a member of the Trump family. He married Elora Sauerbrun (1913–1983), and they had three children: the late John Gordon Trump (1938–2012) of Watertown, Massachusetts; the late Christine Philp (1942–2021) of New London, New Hampshire; and Karen Ingraham of Los Alamos, New Mexico; and six grandchildren. His nephew is Donald Trump, the 45th President of the United States.

Awards and honors
Trump received a number of awards including:
 1947: The King's Medal for Service in the Cause of Freedom (KMS), given by George VI
 1948: The President's Certificate of Merit, presented by Harry S. Truman
 1960: The Lamme Medal, given by the American Institute of Electrical Engineers
 1983: The National Medal of Science, presented by Ronald Reagan for Engineering Sciences

References

1907 births
1985 deaths
20th-century American engineers
20th-century American physicists
American electrical engineers
American inventors
American people of German descent
Columbia Graduate School of Arts and Sciences alumni
Educators from New York City
IEEE Lamme Medal recipients
MIT School of Engineering alumni
MIT School of Engineering faculty
Members of the United States National Academy of Engineering
National Medal of Science laureates
Polytechnic Institute of New York University alumni
Recipients of the King's Medal for Service in the Cause of Freedom
Scientists from New York (state)
John G.
Fellows of the American Physical Society